Psychedelic States is a series of 1960s psychedelic rock and garage rock compilation albums, each focusing on artists from specific states. They were released by Gear Fab Records. Several states had more than one volume representing them.

States
Georgia
Florida
New York
Illinois
Mississippi
Alabama
Maryland
Arkansas
Wisconsin
Colorado
Texas
Ohio
Indiana

Review
AllMusic reviewed the series, giving many of the albums an average of 2.5 to 3 out of five stars while others got 3.5 to 4.5 stars. One of their comments on the series is "Most of the rare and regional singles included in these compilations are badly recorded, poorly performed, and clichéd and derivative at almost every level, which, of course, is probably why they're so prized by collectors."

See also
Nuggets
Pebbles

References

Compilation album series
Psychedelic rock albums by American artists